Swinging Bridge may refer to:

The Swinging Bridge, a novel by Ramabai Espinet, published in 2003 by Harper Collins Publishing
Swinging Bridge, a popular destination in Yosemite Valley
Swinging bridge, a movable bridge that pivots horizontally
Riverside Swinging Bridge, Riverside, Texas, listed on the NRHP

See also
Swing Bridge (disambiguation)